Manuel García (born 20 March 1964) is a former cyclist from Guam. He competed in four events at the 1992 Summer Olympics.

References

External links
 

1964 births
Living people
Guamanian male cyclists
Olympic cyclists of Guam
Cyclists at the 1992 Summer Olympics
American track cyclists
Place of birth missing (living people)